Bale Province may refer to:

 Balé Province, Burkina Faso
 Bale Province, Ethiopia

Province name disambiguation pages